Taraba can refer to:
 Taraba State
 Taraba River
 Taraba (bird), the genus of the great antshrike